Clemens Iten (24 February 1858 – 16 January 1932) was a Swiss politician and President of the Swiss National Council (1902).

Works

External links 
 
 
 Universität Zürich: Clemens Iten

Members of the National Council (Switzerland)
Presidents of the National Council (Switzerland)
1858 births
1932 deaths